Allium unifolium, the one-leaf onion or American garlic, is a North American species of wild onion. It is native to the coastal mountain ranges of California, Oregon, and Baja California. It grows on clay soils including serpentine, at elevations up to 1100 m.

Allium unifolium, despite its name, usually has 2-3 flat leaves up to 50 cm long. Bulbs, though, are usually solitary, egg-shaped, up to 2 cm long, often formed at the end of rhizomes spreading out from the parent plant. Scapes are round in cross-section, up to 80 cm tall. Flowers are up to 15 mm across; tepals usually pink but occasionally white; anthers yellow or purple.

This plant has gained the Royal Horticultural Society's Award of Garden Merit.

References

External links
United States Department of Agriculture Plants Profile

Flora of Baja California
Flora of California
Flora of Oregon
unifolium
Onions
Plants described in 1863
Flora without expected TNC conservation status